Scoparia vulpecula is a species of moth in the family Crambidae.  It is endemic to New Zealand.

Taxonomy
This species was described by Edward Meyrick in 1927 from a female specimen collected by George Hudson at Bold Peak at Lake Wakatipu. However the placement of this species within the genus Scoparia is in doubt. As a result, this species has also been referred to as Scoparia (s.l.) vulpecula.

Description
The wingspan is about 18 mm. The forewings are light fuscous with a few scattered whitish scales. The discal spot is cloudy and darker fuscous. The hindwings are whitish-grey, greyer near the termen. Adults have been recorded on wing in January.

References

Moths described in 1927
Moths of New Zealand
Scorparia
Endemic fauna of New Zealand
Endemic moths of New Zealand